Saint Pierre Island is one of the three main islands of Saint Pierre and Miquelon. It contains the town of Saint-Pierre, which lies on the island's east coast and is the main population centre of the island group. It is part of an overseas collectivity of France, and is located near the Canadian province of Newfoundland and Labrador.

Several smaller islands lie off the coast of Saint Pierre, notably L'Île-aux-Marins and L'Île-aux-Vainqueurs, both to the east, and Grand Colombier, which lies off Saint Pierre's northernmost point.  Saint Pierre and its neighbouring islands form the Saint-Pierre commune, one of two communes in Saint Pierre and Miquelon (the other being Miquelon-Langlade). The island is accessible by ferry from Newfoundland and has immigrations control for the country of France.

 
Islands of Saint Pierre and Miquelon